Richard "Richie" Vandenberg (born 14 January 1977) is a former Australian rules footballer who played for the Hawthorn Football Club (Hawks) in the Australian Football League (AFL). He served as the captain of the Hawks from 2005 to 2007, the final three years of his career.

Early years

Vandenberg is of Dutch descent. Growing up near Wentworth, New South Wales, a small town near Mildura just on the northern side of the Murray River in far western New South Wales, he played junior football for the local club.  He moved to Melbourne to study at the University of Melbourne in 1995, playing with the University Blues where he attracted the attention of Hawthorn recruiters.

AFL career
Vandenberg was selected with pick 78 in the 1997 AFL Draft. He was a solidly built player with a reputation for aggressive play, fronting the AFL Tribunal on many occasions (his most recent being a four-week suspension in 2006). In 2004 he was involved in the 'Line in the Sand' incident, in which Hawthorn and Essendon engaged in an all-out brawl during the third quarter of their round 11 match. As a result, he was suspended for six games.

He was made captain when Shane Crawford stepped down at the end of the 2004 season. New coach Alastair Clarkson chose Vandenberg because he was a man who was "very forthright, honest and has great integrity" qualities his teammates admired.

He struggled to recapture his best form, but in 2006 fitted into his new role more solidly. His 2007 season was marred by injuries. Vandenberg retired at the end of the 2007 season after leading the Hawks to their most successful campaign since 2001.

Post football career

Vandenberg completed his Bachelor of Business at Swinburne University of Technology. He has a long association in the wine industry as a grower through his family enterprise. He is the chief executive officer of LCW Corp, a grape and wine producing company.
In 2016 he was appointed to the  board to fill the casual vacancy following Andrew Newbold's resignation.
He resigned from the board following the 2022 Board Election when his preferred candidate was defeated by popular vote.

References

External links

Australian rules footballers from New South Wales
Australian people of Dutch descent
Hawthorn Football Club players
Hawthorn Football Club administrators
University Blues Football Club players
1977 births
Living people
Swinburne University of Technology alumni